Mario Acerbi (1 July 1913 – 20 February 2010) was an Italian professional football player.

He played for four seasons (77 games, no goals) in the Serie A for A.S. Roma.

Honours
 Serie A champions: 1941–42

External links

1913 births
2010 deaths
Italian footballers
Serie A players
A.S. Roma players
Association football defenders
A.S.D. Fanfulla players